The National University of Lesotho, the main and oldest university in Lesotho, is located in Roma,  southeast of Maseru, the capital of Lesotho. The Roma valley is broad and is surrounded by a barrier of rugged mountains which provides magnificent scenery. The university enjoys a temperate climate with four distinct seasons. The governing body of the university is the council and academic policy is in the hands of Senate, both Council and Senate being established by the Act.

Academics
Faculties and departments:

Membership
The National University of Lesotho is affiliated with the following organizations:
Association of Commonwealth Universities
Association of African Universities
International Association of Universities
Southern African Regional Universities Association
Association of Eastern and Southern African Universities

History

Pius XII Catholic University College

The origins of the National University of Lesotho (NUL) date to April 8, 1945, when a Catholic University College was founded at Roma by the Roman Catholic Hierarchy of Southern Africa. The establishment of this college was a realisation of a decision taken in 1938 by the Synod of Catholic Bishops in South Africa to provide African Catholic students with post-matriculation and religious guidance. The Catholic University College was founded in an isolated valley  from Maseru in a temporary primary school building at Roma Mission.

University of Basutoland, Bechuanaland Protectorate and Swaziland

On January 1, 1964, Pius XII University College was replaced by the independent, non-denominational University of Basutoland, Bechuanaland Protectorate, and Swaziland with its own charter granted by Queen Elizabeth II. By virtue of the same charter, the Oblate Fathers kept a close relationship with the U.B.B.S. through serving on the Council and teaching, as well as in the physical presence of Pius XII College House, a residence for the Oblate community.

University of Botswana, Lesotho and Swaziland
To be in line with the names chosen after independence in 1966, U.B.B.S. became the University of Botswana, Lesotho and Swaziland.

National University of Lesotho

The decision to establish the National University of Lesotho on the Lesotho (Roma) campus site of the former U.B.L.S. was taken on October 20, 1975, by the National Assembly through Act No. 13 of 1975. NUL is the proud heir of Pius XII University College and U.B.L.S. It occupies the same site, grounds, and buildings as its predecessors, as well as additional ones.

Academic performance
The university in ranked 121st in Africa and 6,045th in the world.

There were 9,263 students at the university in 2018; 9,460 in 2017; 9,560 in 2016 and 9,239 in 2015.

There were 2,017 graduates at the university in 2020; 2,120 graduates in 2019 and 2,266 graduates in 2018.

There were 1,387 new enrolled students at the university in 2019 and 2,700 enrolled students in 2018.

The university offers 70 accredited study programmes.

In June 2011, the Lesotho Times reported that half of the students in three of the seven faculties at the university failed their examinations. This "unprecedented failure rate" was in the law, health sciences and science and technology faculties.

Library 
The National University of Lesotho supports open access in Lesotho and has signed the Budapest Open Access Initiative. In 2011, the National University of Lesotho has established the first institutional repository in the country. The National University of Lesotho Institutional Repository (NULIR) is the institutional repository and provides access to the research output of staff and students.

Notable faculty 

 Nthabiseng Mokoena (archaeologist)

Notable alumni
See also :Category:National University of Lesotho alumni

King Letsie III of Lesotho
Queen 'Masenate Mohato Seeiso, Queen Consort of Lesotho
Tito Mboweni, Former Governor of the South African Reserve Bank and former Minister of Finance of South Africa
Phumzile Mlambo-Ngcuka, ex Deputy President of South Africa
Sheila Khala, Lesotho poet and author

Honorary Doctoral recipients
 1967 Mr. S. T. Sukati, Former Chairman and Member of the University Council and Speaker of the National Assembly of Swaziland, Doctor of Laws
 1968 H. E. Sir Seretse Khama, Former Chancellor of UBLS 1967–1970, President of the Republic of Botswana, Doctor of Philosophy
 1971 Professor J. W. Blake, Former Vice-Chancellor, UBLS, 1964–1971, Doctor of letters
 1973 Dr. C. W. de IGewict, President Emeritus, University of Rochester, New York, Member of the University Council. Doctor of Literature
 1973 Dr. H. F. Oppenheimer, Chancellor, University of Cape-Town, Chairman, Anglo American Corporation, Doctor of Literature
 1978 Rev. Dr. Romeo Guilbeault, OMI Former Rector of Pius XII College, 1954–1959, Doctor of Literature
 1978 Dr. Joshua Pulumo Mohapeloa, OBE, Composer, Doctor of Literature
 1978 Dr. Nelson Mandela, First President of South Africa, former Political Leader and Robben Island Detainee in South Africa, Doctor of Laws
 1980 Morena ‘Mako Moliboea, Chief of Khanyane, Doctor of philosophy
 1981 Dr. Amadou-Mahtar M’bow, Director General of UNESCO, Doctor of Philosophy
 1993 Dr. Leabua Jonathan, Prime Minister of Lesotho, Doctor of Education
 1983 Dr. Colin B. Mackay, Former President of the University of New Brunswick, Doctor of Education
 1983 Dr. ’Masechele Khaketla, Author and High School Teacher, Doctor of Literature
 1985 Dr. J.T. Kolane, Former Speaker of the National Assembly 1973–1985 in Lesotho, Doctor of Laws
 1985 Dr. M. Damane, Historian, Doctor of Literature
 1985 Dr. I. Mohamed, Professor of Mathematics, Doctor of Science and Mathematics
 1987 Professor Josias Makibinyane Mohapeloa, Professor and Former Dean of Education, National University of Lesotho, Doctor of Philosophy in Education
 1987 Dr. Julius Nyerere, Former President of the United Republic of Tanzania, Doctor of Laws
 1987 Professor David Blackwell, Professor of Statistics, University of California, Berkeley, Doctor of Science
 1990 Dr. J.J.N. Machobane, Agriculturalist & Writer, Doctor of Philosophy
 1990 Dr. Ntsu Clement Mokhehle, Former Leader of the Basutoland Congress Party, Doctor of Laws
 1990 Dr. Sam Nujoma, President of the Republic of Namibia, Doctor of Laws
 1991 Dr. B.T. Mohapeloa, Teacher & Pioneer of Self-help Organisation, Doctor of Letters
 1992 Dr. Oliver Tambo, Former Leader of the African National Congress, Doctor of Laws
 1996 Dr. B.M. Khaketla, Writer, Doctor of Philosophy
 1997 Dr. Paul Ellenberger, Palaeontologist, Doctor of Science
 2001 Dr. Matamela Cyril Ramaphosa, Fifth President of South Africa, Lawyer, Businessman, Labour and Political Leader, Doctor of Laws.
 2001 Dr. Thokoana James Motlatsi, Businessman and Labour Leader, Doctor of Philosophy in Social Sciences
 2005 Dr. Karabo Eric Lekhanya, Renowned music composer, Doctor of Literature
 2005 Dr. Nkau J. Lepheana, Renowned music composer, Doctor of Literature
 2005 Dr. Benjamin William Mkapa, Former President of the United Republic of Tanzania, Doctor of Law
 2006 Dr. Anthony Malefetsane Setšabi, Former Vice Chancellor of the National University of Lesotho, Doctor of Education
 2006 Dr. Robert Dunbar Leslie, Founder of the Department of Law at the University of Basutoland, Bechuanaland and Swaziland, Doctor of Law
 2010 Professor Adamu David Baikie, Former Vice Chancellor of the National University of Lesotho, Doctor of Philosophy
 2010 Mr. Mothusi Mashologu, Former Vice Chancellor of the National University of Lesotho, Doctor of Literature

References

External links
 Official web site
 Southern African University

 
Buildings and structures in Lesotho
Lesotho, National University of
Maseru District
Education in Lesotho
Educational organisations based in Lesotho
1945 establishments in Basutoland